The anime television series Hensuki is based on the light novel series of the same name written by Tomo Hanama and illustrated by sune. The adaptation was announced on February 20, 2019. The series was animated by Geek Toys and directed by Itsuki Imazaki, with Kenichi Yamashita handling series composition, and Yōsuke Itō designing the characters. Youichi Sakai composed the series' music. Seven was credited for animation production assistance. Ayaka Ōhashi performed the series' opening theme song  which was also used as the ending theme for the twelfth episode. Mia Regina performed the series' ending theme song  Regina also performed the theme song  which was inserted into the seventh episode.  which is performed by TRUE, was used as the ending theme for the seventh episode.

The series aired from July 8 to September 23, 2019 on AT-X, Tokyo MX, MBS, and BS11. The series ran for 12 episodes. The series is licensed in North America by Funimation, in Australia and New Zealand by Madman Entertainment, and in Southeast Asia and South Asia by Muse Communication. A short anime spin-off titled  ran after episodes of the main anime on AT-X. The shorts were directed and written by Itsuki Imazaki.

Episode list

See also 
List of Hensuki volumes

Notes

References

External links 
 

Hensuki